"Combat" is the eleventh episode of the first series of the British science fiction television series Torchwood, which was originally broadcast on the digital television channel BBC Three on 24 December 2006.

In the episode, the alien-hunting team Torchwood investigate kidnappings of aliens called Weevils by Cardiff estate agent Mark Lynch (Alex Hassell), who uses them for deadly cage fights with rich humans.

Plot 
Jack and Gwen are chasing a Weevil through the streets of Cardiff. The two witness the Weevil being captured by unknown men. Several hours later, Toshiko tracks the van to a deserted warehouse. She and Jack go to investigate and find the body of a man who has been mauled by a Weevil; the dead man's phone rings and a distorted voice warns Jack to drop the case. Owen, who is still recovering from Diane Holmes's departure, is reluctantly enlisted to look into the estate agent overseeing the warehouse, disguising himself as an exporter of jellied eels. After getting into a fight at a bar, Owen forms a bond with Mark Lynch, the estate agent. Mark reveals he knows Owen is not who he pretends to be, but wants to show him what happens with captured Weevils anyway.

Meanwhile, Jack and Ianto follow reports of suspicious Weevil-like injuries and interrogate one of the victims at the hospital. The man refuses to talk, and after being pressured by Jack claims that if he talks, "They'll kill me."

The Weevils are used for a fight club, where they are pitted against willing men in a one-on-one fight. Each combatant puts down £1000, and the person who lasts the longest in the cage wins the pot. The people in the fight club are men with disposable income trying to find meaning in their lives. Mark considers Owen weak since he disapproved and he forces him to fight. Owen agrees to fight a Weevil, and he initially stands without fear and does not challenge the Weevil until it strikes him. The rest of Torchwood storm into the complex and pull him out before the Weevil can finish him off. They bust the operation, but Mark gets into the cage with the Weevil Owen was previously fighting to prove he too can show no fear.

Owen admits to Jack that he did not want to be rescued and later goes to Torchwood's captive Weevils, intimidating them.

Continuity
When Mark Lynch searches the Internet for information on Owen, he uses a search engine called search-wise.net. While the site actually exists, it was created specifically for use in television programmes and films. Search-wise.net was also seen in "Rose" where Rose Tyler uses it to search for the Doctor.
Mark tells Owen that "Something's coming. Out there in the darkness, something is coming." Suzie Costello says something similar in "They Keep Killing Suzie", mentioning something moving in the darkness beyond death and that it is coming for Jack. This presence is revealed when the second glove is used in "Dead Man Walking".
After drugging Rhys and confessing her affair with Owen, Gwen begs for forgiveness in much the same manner as she jokingly did in "Everything Changes".

Production
Noel Clarke, who wrote this episode, is better known for playing Mickey Smith in the 2005 and 2006 series of the revived Doctor Who. He is the first actor with an ongoing role in Doctor Who to write a televised episode of a Doctor Who-universe production, although previous Doctor Who actors Colin Baker and Ian Marter wrote the Doctor Who Magazine comic strip "The Age of Chaos" and novels based upon the series after his tenure on the show, respectively. Mark Gatiss has also starred in and written for the show since its 2005 revival.

Music
The song "Over and Over" by Hot Chip plays in the background during a scene in the bar.
The deceased man, Hodges, has a Crazy Frog ring tone on his mobile phone.
The second time Owen returns to the bar and fights the three men the song Be There by UNKLE is playing in the background
The song "Assassin" by Muse plays in the background when Owen first enters the warehouse.

Notes

References

External links

 "Combat" episode guide entry on the BBC website

Torchwood episodes
2006 British television episodes
Films with screenplays by Noel Clarke